Cyrus Arnold (born January 2, 2003) is an American actor. He is best known for portraying Kenny Yankovitch in Mr. Harrigan's Phone, Derek Zoolander Jr. in Zoolander 2, BJ Malloy in Sam & Cat, and Josh Jagorski in the New Line Cinema/HBO Max Original 8-Bit Christmas, as well as, as a cast member in the Disney+ original Just Beyond.

Early life 

Arnold was born in Burbank, California, the son of Lea Anne Wolfe and Blake Arnold. He has a younger brother.

Career 
Arnold began acting at the age of eight, and has since appeared in numerous commercials and television shows. He made his big screen debut as Derek Zoolander Jr. in Zoolander 2. He has stated that he would like to pursue an additional career as a screenwriter.

Filmography

References

External links

Living people
2003 births
Male actors from Burbank, California
American male child actors
American male television actors
American male voice actors
American male film actors
21st-century American male actors